The Anglosphere is a group of English-speaking nations that share cultural or historical ties with the United Kingdom, and which today maintain close political, diplomatic and military co-operation. While the nations included in different sources vary, the Anglosphere is usually not considered to include all countries where English is an official language, so it is not synonymous with anglophone, though the nations that are commonly included were all once part of the British Empire.

The five core countries of the Anglosphere are usually taken to be Australia, Canada, New Zealand, the United Kingdom, and the United States. These countries enjoy close cultural and diplomatic links with one another and are aligned under military and security programmes.

Definitions and variable geometry 
The term Anglosphere was first coined, but not explicitly defined, by the science fiction writer Neal Stephenson in his book The Diamond Age, published in 1995. John Lloyd adopted the term in 2000 and defined it as including English-speaking countries like the United Kingdom, the United States, Canada, Australia, New Zealand, Ireland, South Africa, and the British West Indies. The Merriam-Webster dictionary defines the Anglosphere as "the countries of the world in which the English language and cultural values predominate". However the Anglosphere is usually not considered to include all countries where English is an official language, so it is not synonymous with anglophone, though the nations that are commonly included were all once part of the British Empire.

Core Anglosphere
The definition is usually taken to include Australia, Canada, New Zealand, the United Kingdom, and the United States in a grouping of developed countries called the core Anglosphere. This term can also encompass Ireland and less frequently Malta and the Commonwealth Caribbean countries.

The five core countries in the Anglosphere are developed countries that maintain close cultural and diplomatic links with one another. They are aligned under such military and security programmes as:
ABCANZ Armies
Air and Space Interoperability Council (air forces)
AUSCANNZUKUS (navies)
Border Five
Combined Communications Electronics Board (communications electronics)
Five Eyes (intelligence)
Five Nations Passport Group
Migration 5
The Technical Cooperation Program (technology and science)
The UKUSA Agreement (signals intelligence).

Public opinion research has found that people in the five core Anglosphere countries consistently rank each other's countries as their country's most important allies in the world. Relations have traditionally been warm between Anglosphere countries, with bilateral partnerships such as those between Australia and New Zealand, the United States and Canada and the United States and the United Kingdom (the Special Relationship) constituting the most successful partnerships in the world.

In terms of political systems, Canada, Australia, New Zealand and the United Kingdom have Charles III as head of state, form part of the Commonwealth of Nations and use the Westminster parliamentary system of government. Most of the core countries have first-past-the-post electoral systems, though Australia and New Zealand have reformed their systems and there are other systems used in some elections in the UK. As a consequence, most core Anglosphere countries have politics dominated by two major parties.

Below is a table comparing the five core countries of the Anglosphere (data for 2021/2022):

Culture and economics 
Due to their historic links, the Anglosphere countries share many cultural traits that still persist today. Most countries in the Anglosphere follow the rule of law through common law rather than civil law, and favour democracy with legislative chambers above other political systems. Private property is protected by law or constitution.

Market freedom is high in the five core Anglosphere countries, as all five share the Anglo-Saxon economic model – a capitalist model that emerged in the 1970s based on the Chicago school of economics with origins from the 18th century United Kingdom. The shared sense of globalisation led cities such as New York, London, Los Angeles, Sydney, and Toronto to have considerable impacts on the financial markets and the global economy. Global popular culture has been highly influenced by the United States and the United Kingdom.

Proponents and critics
Proponents of the Anglosphere concept typically come from the political right (such as Andrew Roberts of the UK Conservative Party), and critics from the centre-left (for example Michael Ignatieff of the Liberal Party of Canada).

Proponents
As early as 1897, Albert Venn Dicey  proposed an Anglo-Saxon "intercitizenship" during an address to the Fellows of All Souls at Oxford.

The American businessman James C. Bennett, a proponent of the idea that there is something special about the cultural and legal (common law) traditions of English-speaking nations, writes in his 2004 book The Anglosphere Challenge:

Bennett argues that there are two challenges confronting his concept of the Anglosphere. The first is finding ways to cope with rapid technological advancement and the second is the geopolitical challenges created by what he assumes will be an increasing gap between anglophone prosperity and economic struggles elsewhere.

British historian Andrew Roberts claims that the Anglosphere has been central in the First World War, Second World War and Cold War. He goes on to contend that anglophone unity is necessary for the defeat of Islamism.

According to a 2003 profile in The Guardian, historian Robert Conquest favoured a British withdrawal from the European Union in favour of creating "a much looser association of English-speaking nations, known as the 'Anglosphere'".

CANZUK

Favourability ratings tend to be overwhelmingly positive between countries within a subset of the core Anglosphere known as CANZUK (consisting of Canada, Australia, New Zealand and the United Kingdom), whose members form part of the Commonwealth of Nations and retain Charles III as head of state. In the wake of the United Kingdom's decision to leave the European Union (Brexit) as a result of a referendum held in 2016, there has been mounting political and popular support for a loose free travel and common market area to be formed among the CANZUK countries.

Criticisms
In 2000, Michael Ignatieff wrote in an exchange with Robert Conquest, published by the New York Review of Books, that the term neglects the evolution of fundamental legal and cultural differences between the US and the UK, and the ways in which UK and European norms drew closer together during Britain's membership in the EU through regulatory harmonisation. Of Conquest's view of the Anglosphere, Ignatieff writes: "He seems to believe that Britain should either withdraw from Europe or refuse all further measures of cooperation, which would jeopardize Europe's real achievements. He wants Britain to throw in its lot with a union of English-speaking peoples, and I believe this to be a romantic illusion".

In 2016, Nick Cohen wrote in an article titled "It's a Eurosceptic fantasy that the 'Anglosphere' wants Brexit" for The Spectator'''s Coffee House blog: "'Anglosphere' is just the right's PC replacement for what we used to call in blunter times 'the white Commonwealth'." He repeated this criticism in another article for The Guardian in 2018. Similar criticism was presented by other critics such as Canadian academic Srđan Vučetić.

In 2018, amidst the aftermath of the Brexit referendum, two British professors of public policy Michael Kenny and Nick Pearce published a critical scholarly monograph titled Shadows of Empire: The Anglosphere in British Politics. In one of a series of accompanying opinion pieces, they questioned:

They stated in another article:

Opinion polls
A 2020 poll by YouGov revealed that all four of the other core Anglosphere countries were among the top 10 most positively viewed countries by Americans, with Australia and Canada ranking behind only the United States itself in the poll. Another 2020 poll by YouGov showed that New Zealand, Canada and Australia were the most positively viewed countries by the British.

A 2018 poll by the Lowy Institute similarly indicated that New Zealand, Canada and the United Kingdom were the three most positively viewed countries by Australians. Their 2020 version of the poll again put Canada and the United Kingdom at the top, but New Zealand was not included as an option. A 2020 poll by the Macdonald–Laurier Institute suggested that Australia was the most positively viewed country by Canadians. Australia and the U.S. were ranked as having the most favorable view of Canada's influence to the outside world, according to a 2012 GlobeScan survey of 22 countries. In a 2019 Pew Research Center poll, a plurality of Canadians and Australians named the United States as their country's closest ally.

Comparing core Anglosphere

See also

 Anglo-Americans
 AUKUS
 British diaspora
 English-speaking world
 Eurosphere; Francosphere (French), Hispanosphere (Spanish), Lusosphere (Portuguese)
 Five Power Defence Arrangements
 History of the English-Speaking Peoples'' (Winston Churchill)
 JUSCANZ
 List of countries and territories where English is an official language
 List of countries by English-speaking population
 White Anglo-Saxon Protestant (WASP)

Notes

References

Citations

Further reading
 

 Bennett, James C. "Dreaming Europe in a Wide-Awake World". The National Interest, no. 78 (2004): 119–29. Accessed April 21, 2021.

External links

James C. Bennett (2002) An Anglosphere Primer, presented to the Foreign Policy Research Institute
BBC Radio 4: Archive on 4 (2017-12-16): Return of the Anglosphere
 From Insularity to Exteriority: How the Anglosphere is Shaping Global Governance – Centre for International Policy Studies

 
British Empire
Commonwealth of Nations
European civilizations
Historical regions
Modern civilizations